The Nasdem Party is a political party in Indonesia. It is partly funded by media baron Surya Paloh who founded the similarly named organization, National Democrats. Despite this, and logo similarity, Nasional Demokrat has insisted that it is not linked with the party.

History
The Party has its origins in a now-dormant youth-focused NGO called Nasional Demokrat (National Democrats) founded by Surya Paloh, who owns the media conglomerate Media Group, and Hamengkubuwono X, the sultan of Yogyakarta in 2010. It received extensive coverage on media owned by Surya Paloh. In 2011, Hamengkubuwono left the organization, unhappy with its transformation into a political party. Less than a month later, Surya Paloh formed the Nasdem Party, and appointed former National Mandate Party (PAN) politician Patrice Rio Capella as its first chairman.

The party was officially declared on 26 July 2011, although it had previously registered to the Ministry of Law and Human Rights in March. At the party's first convention in January 2013, Surya Paloh was appointed party chairman for the 2013 - 2018 term. The conference also conferred on him full authority to determine party strategy and policies and to win the 2014 election. Later the same month, one of the other founders and financial backers, media tycoon Hary Tanoesoedibjo, founder of the huge Media Nusantara Citra media group, suddenly left the party in protest at Surya Paloh's appointment and defected to the People's Conscience Party, led by former general Wiranto. Hary subsequently became that party's vice-presidential  candidate. In late 2013 the Nasdem Party applied to contest the 2014 elections, and on 7 January 2014 the General Elections Commission (KPU) announced that the Nasdem was the only new party that met all the requirements. It competed along with 12 other national parties.

Before founding the party, Surya Paloh had been a senior member of the Golkar Party for 40 years and rose to become chairman of the party's advisory council. He contested the presidential nomination at the 2004 Golkar convention, but lost. In 2009, Golkar nominated Jusuf Kalla as its candidate. However, Surya Paloh has "repeatedly denied" that he formed the Nasdem Party to allow him to run for the presidency again. During the 2014 election campaign, the Indonesian Broadcasting Commission criticized Surya Paloh-owned news network MetroTV for its excessive coverage of the party.

In June 2021, the party again came under fire from public when one of its cadre, parliament speaker of Tolikara Regency, Papua was allegedly supplying money and arms to armed groups under Free Papua Movement. The party denied such allegations and said that if proven, they are ready to fire the accused from the party.

Party platform
According to the party website, the party's policies are to:
 Fulfill the needs of the people
 Reject democracy that merely complicates governance without bringing about general prosperity and that only leads to power routinely changing hands without producing quality leaders that set an example.
 Build a mature democracy
 Build a democracy based on strong people who are called on to bring about a bright future
 Restore the ideals of the Indonesian Republic.
 Support the constitutional mandate to build a prosperous nation based on the principles of economic democracy, a law-based state that holds human rights in high regard, and a nation that recognizes diversity
 Bring about a nation that is just, prosperous and sovereign through a Movement for Change to Restore Indonesia.

Cadre Training Facility 
Unlike most political parties in Indonesia which relied on informal training programs for the cadre specialized education and training, Nasdem Party owned its own formalized, advanced and specialized cadre education and training facility named Akademi Bela Negara Nasional Demokrat (English: National Defense Academy of National Democrats), or colloquially called ABN Nasdem. ABN Nasdem is political corporate university, the only kind in Indonesia. ABN Nasdem institution and courses modelled after Indonesia primary national leadership education and training facility, National Resilience Institute (Indonesian: Lembaga Ketahanan Nasional). The academy founded by Surya Paloh and IGK Manila. The academy was inaugurated by Joko Widodo on 16 July 2017. The training materials were condensed into 48 credits for 4 months. It does not issue any degree.

Election results

Legislative election results

Presidential election results

Note: Bold text suggests the party's member

References

2011 establishments in Indonesia
Political parties established in 2011
Political parties in Indonesia
Pancasila political parties
Progressive Alliance
Secularism in Indonesia